Salem Media Group, Inc. (NASDAQ: SALM; formerly Salem Communications Corporation) is an American radio broadcaster, internet content provider, and magazine and book publisher formerly based in Irving, Texas, targeting audiences interested in Christian values and what it describes as "family-themed content and conservative values." 

Salem Media Group owns 117 radio stations in 38 markets, including 60 stations in the top 25 markets and 29 in the top 10, making it tied with Audacy for the fifth-largest radio broadcaster. 

In addition to its radio properties, the company owns:

 Salem Radio Network, which syndicates talk, news and music programming to approximately 2,400 affiliates.
 Salem Media Representatives, a radio advertising company.
 Salem Web Network, an Internet provider of Christian content and online streaming with over 100 Christian content and conservative opinion websites.
 Salem Publishing, a publisher of Christian themed magazines. 
 Conservative websites Townhall.com, RedState, Hot Air, and PJ Media, as well as Twitter aggregator Twitchy.

The company was founded by brothers-in-law Stuart Epperson and Edward G. Atsinger III and is a for-profit corporation. This allows it to buy stations in the commercial radio band which are often higher-powered than those of the FM non-commercial band, and to accept commercial advertising.

History 

In 1974, Atsinger (chief executive officer] and Epperson (chairman of the board) combined their radio assets to create Salem Communications. Beginning with stations in North Carolina and California, Atsinger and Epperson purchased station properties in Boston, San Antonio, New York, San Francisco, Portland, Los Angeles and other markets, converting them to Christian talk stations. In the late 1980s and early 1990s, they expanded formats to include contemporary Christian music (with most stations under this format branded as "The Fish"), news talk (branded as "The Answer"), Spanish-language Christian content, and business programming.

Many of Salem's stations are licensed to subsidiaries, organized by geographical area and media cluster as the company has acquired new stations and their previous licensees.

Salem Communications Corp acquired Twitter curation site, Twitchy.com. In January 2014, the Company announced the acquisition of the assets of Eagle Publishing, including Regnery Publishing, Human Events, and RedState, as well as sister companies Eagle Financial Publications and Eagle Wellness.

On February 23, 2015, Salem Communications changed its name to Salem Media Group.

In 2015, Salem Media Group expanded their digital platform with acquisitions of several businesses and assets, including DividendYieldHunter.com, Stockinvestor.com; DividendInvestor.com, a Spanish Bible mobile app, along with its related website and Facebook properties; the DailyBible mobile app; the Daily Bible Devotion mobile app; and also, Bryan Perry's Newsletters.

In 2016, Salem Media Group continued to expand by acquiring the websites ChristianConcertAlerts.com, Historyonthenet.com and Authentichistory.com; as well as Mike Turner's line of investment products, including TurnerTrends.com; the Retirement Watch newsletter and website, Retirementwatch.com; and the King James Bible mobile application. Salem Media Group also acquired Mill City Press from Hillcrest Publishing Group, Inc.

In July 2017, Salem Media Group merged DividendYieldHunter.com and transferred all content into DividendInvestor.com.

In March 2019, political writer Raheem Kassam and lawyer Will Chamberlain purchased Human Events from Salem Media Group for $300,000.

In early 2021, the company moved most operations from the former main operations city of Camarillo, California to Irving, Texas, the same location of their long-owned radio station KLTY.

Radio stations and licensees
Salem's radio stations are organized into six categories: 
 Christian talk and teaching, which consists of brokered programming in blocks produced and paid for by local and national ministries (the long-form format makes traditional commercial breaks impossible), with some stations branded as The Mission or The Word.
 Conservative talk, a variant on the News/Talk format, focused around Salem Radio Network's Talk programs (see below). Most of these stations utilize the branding names The Answer or The Patriot.
 Contemporary Christian Music, an FM format with such stations branded as The Fish.
 Spanish-language Christian talk and/or music, utilizing the branding Radio Luz.
 Business talk, with these stations collectively branded as The Wall Street Business Network.
 and a grouping of other stations not in one of those five categories.

, Salem's radio stations and licensees (with stations arranged by state and market served) are:

Bison Media

Inspiration Media, Inc.

New Inspiration Broadcasting Co., Inc.

Salem Communications Holding Corporation

Inspiration Media of Texas, LLC.

Reach Satellite Network, Inc.

Salem Media of Massachusetts, LLC.

Salem Media of Colorado, Inc. 

Salem Media of Hawaii, Inc. 

Salem Media of Illinois, LLC.

Salem Media of New York, LLC.

Salem Media of Ohio, Inc. 

Salem Media of Oregon, Inc. 

Salem Media of Texas, Inc. 

SCA-Palo Alto, LLC.

Salem Radio Network 

Salem Radio Network is a satellite radio network serving general market News/Talk stations and Christian-formatted stations through affiliate partnerships serving more than 2,700 radio stations.
The five major divisions are SRN Talk, SRN News, Salem Music Network, Salem Media Reps and Vista Media Reps and SRN Satellite Services.
 SRN Talk produces general market News/Talk shows featuring nationally syndicated hosts Hugh Hewitt, Mike Gallagher, Dennis Prager, Sebastian Gorka, Brandon Tatum, and Charlie Kirk. It also produces Christian market programming featuring The Eric Metaxas Show.
 SRN News is a news source for conservative and Christian radio serving over 2,000 affiliates, and stations also take newscast branded by Salem's Townhall.com.
 The Salem Music Network has three satellite offerings – Contemporary Christian, Praise and Southern Gospel.
 Salem Media Reps specializes in Christian, family-themed and conservative media, radio, online, print and mobile.
 SRN Satellite Services provides satellite distribution and production services to over 70 organizations and ministries.

The satellite feed for Salem's general market programming can be heard on the CRN Digital Talk Radio Networks, on CRN3.

Salem Publishing 
Salem's flagship publication, CCM Magazine, was in the Christian music industry for more than 25 years. Salem no longer prints CCM Magazine, but it still exists in an online-only format. Other magazine publications include Singing News Magazine, which discusses happenings involving the Southern gospel community.

Salem Author Services 

Under the umbrella of Salem Author Service are Xulon Press, Mill City Press, and the websites Bookprinting.com, Bookediting.com, Publishgreen.com, and Libertyhill.com.

Xulon Press is a self-publishing digital publisher of books targeting a Christian audience. They use print on demand technologies that store books electronically and print them only as they are ordered. Xulon was founded by Christian author and publisher Tom Freiling and was acquired by Salem in 2006.

Salem Español Online 

Salem owns a collection of Spanish language sites that provide a variety of Christian and family-friendly resources online.  A few of those sites are CristoTarjetas.com; ElsitioCristiano.com; BibliaVida.com and LuzMundial.com.

Political activities 

The founders of Salem Communications support various religious causes, and are noted for their role in spreading politically conservative opinion to areas dependent on radio for current events information. In 2005, Epperson was reported in Time magazine as one of the "25 Most Influential Evangelicals in America". In 2004 he co-chaired "Americans of Faith", a religiously based Republican electoral campaign. Both founders have served on the Council for National Policy, a group of conservative influencers, intellectuals, donors, and former elected officials known to feature right-wing extremists as members, and Epperson has served as president of the Council. They gave $100,000 to the Bush presidential reelection campaign and $780,000 to the 2000 "California Defense of Marriage Act" (Proposition 22) ballot measure.

References

External links

1980s establishments in California
Mass media companies established in the 1980s
 
Political organizations based in the United States
Radio broadcasting companies of the United States
Christian mass media companies
Christian websites
Mass media companies of the United States
Companies based in Ventura County, California
Companies listed on the Nasdaq
Conservative media in the United States
Conservative organizations in the United States